The 1900–01 season was the 28th season of competitive football in Scotland and the 11th season of the Scottish Football League.

League competitions

Scottish League Division One

Champions: Rangers

Scottish League Division Two

Other honours

Cup honours

National

County

Non-league honours

Senior
Highland League

Other Leagues

Scotland national team

Key:
 (H) = Home match
 (A) = Away match
 BHC = British Home Championship

Other national teams

Scottish League XI

Notes

See also
1900–01 Rangers F.C. season

References

External links
Scottish Football Historical Archive

 
Seasons in Scottish football